Hans Kopfermann (26 April 1895, in Breckenheim near Wiesbaden – 28 January 1963, in Heidelberg) was a German atomic and nuclear physicist. He devoted his entire career to spectroscopic investigations, and he did pioneering work in measuring nuclear spin. During World War II, he worked on the German nuclear energy project, also known as the Uranium Club.

Education

After World War I, he continued his studies at the Georg-August University of Göttingen under James Franck. He received his doctorate there in 1925.

Career

After receipt of his doctorate, Kopferman went to work with Rudolf Ladenburg, who was a staff scientist at the Kaiser-Wilhelm Institut für physikalische Chemie und Elektrochemie (Kaiser Wilhelm Institute for Physical Chemistry and Electrochemistry; today, the ), in Berlin-Dahlem. Kopfermann investigated dispersion<ref>Hans Kopfermann and Rudolf Ladenburg ,  Volume 48, Numbers 1-2, 26-50 (1928)</ref> and stimulated emission. In 1931, he began the study of the hyperfine structure of spectral lines, which began his pioneering work on measuring nuclear spin.Mehra and Rechenberg, Volume 6, Part 1, 2000, 351n413.

He then spent a year of research under Niels Bohr at the Institute of Theoretical Physics in Copenhagen.

In 1940, the publication of his book on the nuclear moment, influenced the next generation of nuclear physicists. He remained at Kiel until 1942.

While at the University of Kiel, Kopfermann was a principal participant in an event organized by Wolfgang Finkelnburg.

The  movement was anti-Semitic and anti-theoretical physics. As applied in the university environment, political factors took priority over the historically applied concept of scholarly ability, even though its two most prominent supporters were the Nobel Laureates in Physics Philipp Lenard and Johannes Stark. When Adolf Hitler became Chancellor of Germany on 30 January 1933, the concept and movement took on more favor and more fervor. Supporters of  launched vicious attacks against leading theoretical physicists, including Arnold Sommerfeld and Werner Heisenberg.

The event was an offensive against the  movement. Finkelnburg invited five representatives to make arguments for theoretical physics and academic decisions based on ability, rather than politics: Carl Friedrich von Weizsäcker, Otto Scherzer, Georg Joos, Otto Heckmann, and Hans Kopfermann. The discussion was led by Gustav Borer, with Herbert Stuart and Johannes Malsch as observers. While the technical outcome of the event may have been thin, it was a political victory against  and signaled the decline of the influence of the movement within the German Reich.In part, Finkelnburg’s role in organizing the  influenced Carl Ramsauer, as president of the Deutsche Physikalische Gesellschaft, to select Finkelnburg in 1941 as his deputy. See Document 86: Letter to Ludwig Prandtl by Carl Ramsauer, 4 June 1944, in Hentschel, 1996, 267-268.

In 1935, an ordinance related to the Civil Services act, the Law on the Retirement and Transfer of Professors as a Result of the Reorganization of the German System of Higher Education, was used to forcibly transfer Georg Joos to Göttingen to fill Frank's position as ordinarius professor and director of the Second Physics Institute. In 1942, Kopfermann was appointed as ordinarius professor on the chair for experimental physics, formerly held by Franck and then Joos. Additionally, he built a 6-MeV betatron, studied atomic beams, resonance, and the biological effects of radiation, and developed methods of optical interferometry.Mehra and Rechenberg, Volume 6, Part 1, 2000, 351n413.

Electromagnetic mass spectrometry was investigated for the separation of uranium isotopes.Horst Kant Werner Heisenberg and the German Uranium Project / Otto Hahn and the Declarations of Mainau and Göttingen, Preprint 203 (Max-Planck Institut für Wissenschaftsgeschichte, 2002), p. 19.Kurt Diebner Listing of Nuclear Research Commissions Enclosed with a Letter to the President of the Reich Research Council [April 18. 1944] in Document #104 in Hentschel and Hentschel, 1996, 322-324.

While there, he served on the council of CERN.Mehra and Rechenberg, Volume 6, Part 1, 2000, 351n413.

Other members of the Nuclear Physics Working Group in both 1956 and 1957 were: Werner Heisenberg (chairman), Hans Kopfermann (vice-chairman), Fritz Bopp, Walther Bothe, Wolfgang Gentner, Otto Haxel, Willibald Jentschke, Heinz Maier-Leibnitz, Josef Mattauch, Wilhelm Walcher, and Carl Friedrich von Weizsäcker. Wolfgang Paul was also a member of the group during 1957.

Honors

Kopfermann was afforded a number of honors, which included election to the Academies of Göttingen, Heidelberg, and Copenhagen.

Books
Hans Kopfermann Kernmomente and Nuclear Momenta (Akademischer Verlag, 1940, 1956, and Academic Press, 1958)
Hans Kopfermann Physics of the electron shells (The American FIAT review of German science, 1939-1945, Volume 12) (Office of Military Government for Germany Field Information Agencies, Technical, 1948)
Hans Kopfermann  (Verlag Chemie, 1953)
Hans Kopfermann  (Springer, 1960)

Selected publications
Hans Kopfermann and Rudolf Ladenburg ,  Volume 48, Numbers 1-2, 26-50 (1928). The authors were identified as being at Berlin-Dahlem. The article was received on December 17, 1927.
Rudolf Landenburg and Hans Kopfermann ,  Volume 139, 375–385 (1928)

Notes

References

Beyerchen, Alan D. Scientists Under Hitler: Politics and the Physics Community in the Third Reich (Yale, 1977) 
Hentschel, Klaus (editor) and Ann M. Hentschel (editorial assistant and translator) Physics and National Socialism: An Anthology of Primary Sources (Birkhäuser, 1996) 
Lieb, Klaus-Peter Theodor Schmidt and Hans Kopfermann – Pioneers in Hyperfine Physics, Hyperfine Interactions Volume 136-137, Numbers 3-8, 783-802 (2001). Institutional citation: .
Mehra, Jagdish and Helmut Rechenberg The Historical Development of Quantum Theory. Volume 6: The Completion of Quantum Mechanics 1926-1941, Part 1: The Probability Interpretation and the Statistical Transformation Theory, the Physical Interpretation, and the Empirical and Mathematical Foundations of Quantum Mechanics 1926-1932 (Springer, 2000)
Walker, Mark German National Socialism and the Quest for Nuclear Power 1939–1949 (Cambridge, 1993) 

1895 births
1963 deaths
Nuclear program of Nazi Germany
Scientists from Wiesbaden
People from Hesse-Nassau
University of Erlangen-Nuremberg alumni
Humboldt University of Berlin alumni
Academic staff of the Humboldt University of Berlin
University of Göttingen alumni
Academic staff of the University of Göttingen
Academic staff of the Technical University of Berlin
Academic staff of the University of Kiel
Academic staff of Technische Universität Darmstadt
Academic staff of Heidelberg University
People associated with CERN
20th-century German physicists